Summerfield Johnston may refer to:

Summerfield Johnston Jr. (born 1932)
Summerfield Johnston III (1954–2007)